Pain & Paper is the third studio album by American recording artist Lil' Mo. The album was released on August 28, 2007, by Drakeweb Music Group & Koch Records. It sold only 6,000 copies it first week. Appearances include Da Brat, Jim Jones, Fabolous, and Trina. Producers and songwriters include Jazze Pha, Stargate, Sean Garrett and Ne-Yo.

Background
In 2006, Lil' Mo, alongside Faith Evans, Fantasia, and R&B-turned-gospel singer Coko, appeared on the remake of The Clark Sisters' "Endow Me" from Coko's gospel album Grateful (2006). Under her independent label HoneyChild Entertainment, Lil' Mo released the album Pain & Paper on August 28, 2007, with support from Ike Morris and Morris Management Group. The album featured production from Joey Cutless, Bryan-Michael Cox, Jules "Judah," Mike Moore, Troy Taylor, Adam "Streets" Arwine, Daniel "D-Up" Allen, Wesley "Mister Wes" Toone, among others. The first single from the effort included "Sumtimes I" featuring rapper Jim Jones. Later in the year, a second and final single, "Lucky Her", was released.

Critical reception

Mark Edward Nero from About.com wrote that the singer "has the vocal and stylistic maturity to also appeal people in their late 30s and 40s, making this the rare R&B album that has a lot for fans of traditional R&B as well as the more modern type." He felt that Pain & Paper "is a true gem that probably won't get a fraction of the attention it deserves." AllMusic found that on Pain & Paper, "Lil' Mo offers up a confident, sophisticated set of R&B. While many of her peers focus on vocal histrionics, Mo presents her songs with intuitive restraint and real emotion [...] Although she lacks a high profile, Mo proves that she's one of the better singers in the game with this excellent 2007 outing." AllHipHop remarked that "it's disappointing to fathom that Pain & Paper produces minimal growth from the woman who brought us such hood classics like "Superwoman." While each song appears to say something, most listeners will probably hear nothing. There is little intrinsically deep about Pain & Paper; it has no soul. While it can be assumed that Lil' Mo's experiences should inspire life-changing music, maybe her new label put the ax on that."

Singles
The lead single "Sumtimes I" was released on June 25, 2007. It features rapper Jim Jones. Its music video was directed by Gabriel E. Hart of Drew Barrymore's unreleased VH1 program Shoot to Kill. The second single "Lucky Her" was released in September 2007.

Track listing

Notes
 denotes additional producer

Charts

References

2007 albums
Lil' Mo albums
Albums produced by Bryan-Michael Cox
Albums produced by Troy Taylor (record producer)